Monique Bauer-Lagier (1 December 1922 - 19 February 2006) was a politician (LPS) in francophone Switzerland.   For cantonal elections Geneva, her home canton and political base, introduced female suffrage as early as 1960, but at a national level Switzerland  was more of a laggard, retaining male only voting for general elections till 1971.   This meant that Bauer-Lagier was something of a trail blazer:  women's rights featured strongly on her political agenda.

Life 
Monique Lagier was born in Meyrin, then a farming village in the Canton of Geneva located a short distance to the north-west of the city.  Jean and Thérèse Lagier, her parents, were teachers.

She underwent a classical education and passed her school leaving exams (Matura) in 1941.   Being female she was not required to perform military service, instead going on directly to obtain a degree in Pedagogy from the Institute of Education Sciences (" Institut des sciences de l'éducation") in Geneva.   After this she worked for eight years as a teacher.   Her political career started with her election in 1973 to the Geneva cantonal parliament:  she retained her seat till 1977.   Meanwhile in 1975 she was elected to the National Council - effectively the lower house of the Swiss federal parliament.   She switched to the upper house in 1979, remaining a member till 1987.   She also became a member of the national committee of the Liberal Party.

She supported women's rights and was a strong advocate for the new marriage law and for equal rights for men and women more broadly in government commissions.   She focused on Minority rights, Ecological protection, a new economic world order internationally between north and south, and meaningful dialogue between east and west.

She was chair of several organisations - a parliamentary group for refugees, the International Geneva Peace Institute, Swiss Aids Support, Bread for All and the International Union of Swiss language parliamentarians.

Personal 
She married Paul-A. Bauer, a physician.   The couple had three children.

References 

1922 births
2006 deaths
People from the canton of Geneva
Swiss Calvinist and Reformed Christians
Liberal Party of Switzerland politicians
Women members of the National Council (Switzerland)
Members of the National Council (Switzerland)
Members of the Council of States (Switzerland)
Canton of Geneva politicians
Swiss feminists
20th-century Swiss women politicians
Women members of the Council of States (Switzerland)
20th-century Swiss politicians